Red Oak is a city in, and the county seat of, Montgomery County, Iowa, United States, located along the East Nishnabotna River. The population was 5,362 in the 2020 census, a decline from the 6,197 population in 2000.

History

Red Oak derives its name from Red Oak Creek which flows through the community and was noted for the red oaks on its banks.  The first settlers arrived there in the 1850s.  In 1865 it became the official county seat of Montgomery County and the courthouse which had been in the middle of the county seven miles northeast in Frankfort, Iowa was towed to the community during a snow storm.  That courthouse remained in place until the current Montgomery County Courthouse was built in 1891.  It is on the National Register of Historic Places.

In 1869 the community was officially founded when the Chicago, Burlington and Quincy Railroad (called the Burlington and Missouri River Railroad at the time) arrived.  The community was named Red Oak Junction by the railroad on March 20, 1876. The junction was a line off the main Chicago to Council Bluffs, Iowa line that went to Nebraska City, Nebraska and on to Lincoln, Nebraska.  The Junction name was dropped in 1901 although the community continues to celebrate its history each summer in Junction Days. In 1903 a depot was opened by the railroad. Preservation efforts for the depot have been enacted since 1993. Today it is the Restored BN and World War II Museum celebrating the community's disproportionate casualties during World War II and other wars, significant military heritage and community pride in service to country.  The depot is one of nine places in Montgomery County on the National Register of Historic Places listings in Montgomery County, Iowa.

Darwin R. Merritt, born in Red Oak on April 12, 1872, graduated third in his class from the United States Naval Academy in Annapolis, Maryland on July 1, 1897. His body was later recovered and interred in Evergreen Cemetery in Red Oak.

The community suffered, in a national per capita comparison, a disproportionate number of casualties in the Civil War and World War II.

In the American Civil War, the area provided more Union troops per capita than any other in the state.  Company M (which also included residents from Montgomery County) had 160 casualties among its 250 members; 52 men were killed in action.

Early World War II battles claimed a disproportionate number of soldiers from Red Oak, although the final casualty statistics tend to disprove the oft-repeated statement that Red Oak suffered more losses per capita than any other American community. In the Battle of Kasserine Pass in February 1943, forty-five soldiers from Red Oak alone were captured or killed; more than 100 telegrams arrived in Red Oak saying that its soldiers were missing in action.  In recognition of Red Oak's casualties, the city's name was given to a "victory ship". The SS Red Oak Victory has become a floating museum in the shipyard where it was built, in Richmond, California.

The old Burlington Northern depot has been transformed into the Restored BN Depot and World War II Museum telling this history.

The Red Oak School District was established in 1870, while Webster Eaton first published the Red Oak Express newspaper in 1868.

Geography
Red Oak is located at  (41.011681, -95.227227).

Climate

Demographics

2010 census
At the 2010 census there were 5,742 people in 2,481 households, including 1,475 families, in the city. The racial makeup of the city was 96.3% White, 0.3% African American, 0.4% Native American, 0.2% Asian, 1.4% from other races, and 1.3% from two or more races. Hispanic or Latino of any race were 4.2%.

Of the 2,481 households 28.7% had children under the age of 18 living with them, 42.7% were married couples living together, 11.8% had a female householder with no husband present, 5.0% had a male householder with no wife present, and 40.5% were non-families. 34.9% of households were one person and 16.8% were one person aged 65 or older. The average household size was 2.26 and the average family size was 2.90.

The median age was 42.2 years. 24.4% of residents were under the age of 18; 6.6% were between the ages of 18 and 24; 22.2% were from 25 to 44; 26.6% were from 45 to 64; and 20.1% were 65 or older. The gender makeup of the city was 47.6% male and 52.4% female.

2000 census
At the 2000 census there were 6,197 people in 2,670 households, including 1,650 families, in the city. The racial makeup of the city was 97.42% Caucasian, African American African American (U.S. Census), 0.11% Asian (U.S. Census), 0.50% Native American, 0.37% Asian, 0.02% Pacific Islander, 1.11% from other races, and 0.47% from two or more races. Hispanic or Latino of any race were 2.15%.

Of the 2,670 households 28.7% had children under the age of 18 living with them, 47.6% were married couples living together, 10.7% had a female householder with no husband present, and 38.2% were non-families. 33.8% of households were one person and 16.8% were one person aged 65 or older. The average household size was 2.27 and the average family size was 2.89.

Age spread:  24.6% under the age of 18, 7.0% from 18 to 24, 25.7% from 25 to 44, 21.9% from 45 to 64, and 20.8% 65 or older. The median age was 40 years. For every 100 females, there were 83.0 males. For every 100 females age 18 and over, there were 79.9 males.

The median household income was $30,098 and the median family income  was $37,007. Males had a median income of $28,942 versus $20,047 for females. The per capita income for the city was $15,793. About 7.9% of families and 10.3% of the population were below the poverty line, including 14.8% of those under age 18 and 6.2% of those age 65 or over.

Health care 
The Montgomery County Memorial Hospital (MCMH) is located in Red Oak. MCMH is a modern 25-bed facility with birth to hospice capabilities. MCMH management puts an emphasis on health care for the local community inside the hospital and with programs outside of the hospital.
Hospital history
It began as Red Oak Hospital when Dr. B.F. Gillmor opened a 15-bed hospital in 1920. In 1931 it was renamed the Murphy Memorial Hospital in honor of a bequest of $40,000 from Thomas D. and Ina C. Murphy. In 1941 a 26-bed hospital was built in a new location, with an addition in 1951. In 1961 a long-term care unit, named Highland Acres, was constructed. In 1978 in a special election voters approved of Montgomery County taking ownership of Murphy Memorial Hospital. The facility then became known as Montgomery County Memorial Hospital. In 1989 a new hospital was built and in 1993 a Physicians Center was added.

Education
The Red Oak Community School District operates local public schools.

Points of interest
 Red Oak had a horse-drawn streetcar system from 1882 to 1901.
 It has a transmitter for the Iowa Public television system.
 Red Oak is mentioned in Willa Cather's 1912 short story The Bohemian Girl.
 Red Oak is mentioned in Sarah Raymond Herndon's book Days On The Road: Crossing The Plains In 1865

Notable people  

Dennis Ashbaugh, painter
James R. Bennett, Secretary of State of Alabama 1993–2003, 2013-2015
Lou Blonger (1849-1924), Wild West saloonkeeper
Johnny Carson (1925–2005), entertainer, host of The Tonight Show Starring Johnny Carson
Clyde Cessna (1879-1954), founder of Cessna Aircraft Company
Horace E. Deemer (1858-1917), Chief Justice of Iowa Supreme Court 
Thomas Harlan Ellett (1880-1951), New York City architect
Joni Ernst, Republican member of Iowa Senate, junior member of the United States Senate
Ida M. Evans, short story writer
Kenneth A. Evans (1898-1970), Republican member of Iowa Senate 1937-45 and Lieutenant Governor of Iowa from 1945 to 1951
Kurt Griffey (1968), Guitarist for Creedence Clearwater Revisited.
Raymond Hatton (1887-1971), actor
Elvin Hutchison (1912-2001), running back for the Detroit Lions and National Football League official
James E. Kearney (1884–1977), Roman Catholic bishop
Dick Kenworthy, Major League Baseball third baseman for the Chicago White Sox
John Milton Killits (1858-1938), United States federal judge in the United States District Court for the Northern District of Ohio from 1910 to 1928
John Logan (poet) (1923-1987), poet and professor
Smith McPherson (1848-1915), Iowa Attorney General from 1881 to 1885
L. Welch Pogue (1899-2003), aviation attorney and chairman of the now-defunct Civil Aeronautics Board.
 Chauncy Sager (1827-1908), First Postmaster of Montgomery County, Iowa.
Stephen Shortridge, actor
Con Starkel (1880-1933), Major League Baseball pitcher for the Washington Senators
Duane Thompson (1903-1970), actress in silent films
Nellie Walker (1874–1973), sculptor best known for statue of James Harlan in National Statuary Hall Collection in the United States Capitol
Fred Lawrence Whipple (1906-2004), astronomer, creator of the Whipple shield and Professor of Astronomy at Harvard University from 1950 to 1977

References

External links

 

 Red Oak's Website Portal style website.
 The Red Oak Express Area wide local print and online newspaper.
 City Data Comprehensive Statistical Data and more about Red Oak.
 Red Oak Community School District Local School District Website

 
Cities in Iowa
Cities in Montgomery County, Iowa
County seats in Iowa